Discography for the 1980s pop duo The Communards.

Both of their studio albums, Communards and Red, reached the top ten and achieved Platinum status in the UK.

The Communards had success during the latter part of the decade with two hit studio albums and nine hit singles. Since their demise, there has been some commercial success with the releases of various compilation albums.

Albums

Studio albums

Compilation albums

Live albums

Singles

Remix singles
 (1986) "Disenchanted"  US Hot Dance Music/Maxi-Singles Sales #43
 (1986) "Don't Leave Me This Way"US Hot Dance Music/Maxi-Singles Sales #3US Club Play Singles #1
 (1986) "So Cold the Night"US Club Play Singles #25
 (1987) "Never Can Say Goodbye"US Hot Dance Music/Maxi-Singles Sales #3US Club Play Singles #2

Videos

References

See also 
 Jimmy Somerville discography
 Bronski Beat discography
 Banderas - Communards offshoot featuring backing musician Sally Herbert

Discographies of British artists
Pop music group discographies